This article lists the monarchs of Vietnam. Under the emperor at home, king abroad system used by later dynasties, Vietnamese monarchs would use the title of emperor (皇帝, Hoàng đế; or other equivalents) domestically, and the more common term sovereign (𤤰, Vua), king (王, Vương), or his/her (Imperial) Majesty (陛下, Bệ hạ).

Overview

Some Vietnamese monarchs declared themselves kings (vương) or emperors (hoàng đế). Imperial titles were used for both domestic and foreign affairs, except for diplomatic missions to China where Vietnamese monarchs were regarded as kingship or prince. Many of the Later Lê monarchs were figurehead rulers, with the real powers resting on feudal lords and princes who were technically their servants. Most Vietnamese monarchs are known through their posthumous names or temple names, while the Nguyễn dynasty, the last reigning house is known through their era names.

Titles

Vietnamese titles
Vietnamese monarchs used and were referred to by many titles, depending on each ruler's prestige and favor. Except for legendary rulers and the Sinitic-speaking Zhao dynasty and the Early Ly dynasty, the most popular and common Vietnamese designation for ruler, vua 𪼀 (lit. sovereign, chieftain), according to Liam C. Kelley, is "largely based on a pure semantic association based on the benevolent feature associated to the 'father' (but, on the other hand, the image of the father may also be terrifying, strict, or even mean)." Because there is no elaborated Chinese character or any attempt to standardize the Sino-Vietnamese Chữ Nôm script to render vua, the title was rendered in different ways. Vua in Ancient Vietnamese (10th–15th centuries) is attested in the 14th-century Buddhist literature Việt Điện U Linh Tập as bùgài (布蓋) in Chinese or vua cái (great sovereign in Vietnamese), in 15th-century Buddhist scripture Phật thuyết đại báo phụ mẫu ân trọng kinh as sībù (司布); in Middle Vietnamese (16th–17th centuries) as ꞗua or bua; becoming vua in Early Modern Vietnamese (18-19th centuries) such as recorded by Alexis-Marie de Rochon's A Voyage to Madagascar and the East Indies. Vua is not found in any Vietnamese dynastic records which all were written in the lingua franca Chữ Hán through.

According to Mark Alves, Vietnamese vua was seemingly a loan word borrowed from the Old Chinese form of title Wáng (王, king), *‍ɢʷaŋ, to Proto-Viet-Muong. Frédéric Pain, however, insists that vua is from a completely indigenous Vietic lexicon, derived from sesquisyllabic proto-Vietic *k.bɔ. While the monarch was commonly referred vernacularly as vua, Vietnamese royal records and official ceremonial titles kept bearing hoàng đế (emperor) or vương (king), which are Vietnamese renditions of Chinese royal titles Huángdì and Wáng. They were employed to show the Vietnamese monarchs' credence, and the latter was used in tributary relations with the Chinese empires without being considered a Chinese subject.

Buddhism exerted influence on a number of Vietnamese royal titles, such as when the late 12th-century devout Buddhist king Lý Cao Tông (r. 1176–1210) demanded his courtiers to refer him as phật (Buddha). His great-grandfather and predecessor Lý Nhân Tông (r. 1072–1127), a great patronizer of the Buddhist sangha, in his stelae inscription erected in 1121, compared himself and his accomplishments with ancient rulers of the Indian subcontinent near the time of Gautama Buddha, particularly king Udayana and emperor Aśoka.

Cham titles
Cham rulers of the former kingdom of Champa in present-day Central and Southern Vietnam used many titles, mostly derived from Hindu Sanskrit titles. There were prefix titles, among them, Jaya and Śrī, which Śrī (His glorious, His Majesty) was used more commonly before each ruler's name, and sometimes Śrī and Jaya were combined into Śrī Jaya[monarch name]. Royal titles were used to indicate the power and prestige of rulers: raja-di-raja (king of kings), maharajadhiraja (great king of kings), arddharaja (vice king/junior king). After the fall of Vijaya Champa and the Simhavarmanid dynasty in 1471, all Sanskrit titles disappeared from Cham records, due to southern Panduranga rulers styled themselves as Po (native Cham title, which also means "King, His Majesty, Her Majesty"), and Islam gradually replaced Hinduism in post-1471 Champa.

Ancient period

Hồng Bàng period 
According to tradition there were eighteen of the Hùng kings of the Hồng Bàng period, known then as Văn Lang at that time, from around 2879 BC to around 258 BC. Following is the list of 18 lines of Hùng kings as recorded in the book Việt Nam sử lược by Trần Trọng Kim.

Âu Lạc (257–207 BC or 207–179 BC)

Kingdom of Nanyue (207–111 BC) 

There is still a debate about the status of the Triệu dynasty (Zhao dynasty): traditional Vietnamese historians considered the Triệu dynasty as a local Vietnamese dynasty while modern Vietnamese historians typically consider the Triệu dynasty as a Chinese dynasty.

1st, 2nd, 3rd Chinese domination period (111 BC - 938 AD)

Trưng Sisters (40–43)

Mai rebellions (713–723)

Phùng rebellions (779–791)

Early Lý dynasty (544–602) 

Đào Lang Vương is not officially considered as king of Early Lý dynasty as he was a self-claimed king.

Autonomous period (866–938) & Independent period (938–1407)

Tĩnh Hải quân (866–938) 

At this time, the Khúc leaders still held the title of Jiedushi, hence they are not official kings of Vietnam.

Ngô dynasty (939–967)

Interregnum (944-968)

Warring states period 

The throne of Ngô dynasty was upsurged by  Dương Tam Kha ,the brother-in-law of Ngô Quyền and this led to anger among those who were loyal to Ngô dynasty. The local warlords decided to make the rebellions to claim the throne.

State of Đại Cồ Việt (968–1054) & State of Đại Việt (1054–1400, 1427–1804)

Đinh dynasty (968–980)

Early Lê dynasty (980–1009)

Later Lý dynasty (1009–1225)

Trần dynasty (1225–1400)

State of Đại Ngu (1400–1407)

Hồ dynasty (1400–1407)

Fourth Chinese domination period (1407–1427)

Later Trần dynasty (1407–1414)

Second independent period (1427–1883)

Later Lê dynasty – Early period (1428–1527)

Northern and Southern dynasty (1533–1592)

Northern dynasty – Mạc dynasty (1527–1592)

Southern dynasty – Revival Lê dynasty – Warlord period (1533–1789)

Tonkin – Trịnh lords (1545–1787)  

Trịnh Kiểm never declared himself as Lord during his rule, his titles were posthumously given by his descendants. Hence he is not considered as an official Trịnh Lord.

Cochinchina – Nguyễn lords (1558–1777)  

Nguyễn Phúc Dương was established by Tây Sơn leaders (Nguyễn Nhạc, Nguyễn Huệ and Nguyễn Lữ) as a puppet Nguyễn Lord for their political purpose during Tây Sơn uprising. Hence he is sometimes not considered as an official Nguyễn lord.

Tây Sơn dynasty (1778–1802) 

Nguyễn Nhạc dropped his emperor title in 1788 after his younger brother – Nguyễn Huệ – declared himself as Emperor.

Empire of Great Vietnam (1802–1883), Annam and Tonkin Protectorates (1883–1945), and Empire of Vietnam (1945)

Nguyễn dynasty (1802–1945)

Non-Vietnamese nations

Champa (192–1832)

Funan (68–550)

Chenla (550–802)

Ngưu Hống (11th century – 1433)

See also
 Family tree of Vietnamese monarchs
 List of Vietnamese dynasties
 Vietnamese era name
 Emperor at home, king abroad

References

Citations

Sources 
 
 
 
 
 
 
 
 

 
Vietnam
Vietnam history-related lists
Vietnamese dynasties